The Apology Act (Bill 108, 2009) is a law in the province of Ontario that provides apologies made by a person does not necessarily constitute an admission of guilt.

Summary 
The law contains several exceptions, including apologies made while testifying at a civil proceeding and to allow some apologies to be used as admission of guilt under the Provincial Offences Act.

Legislative history 
The bill was originally introduced in April 2008 as a private member's bill by David Orazietti, Liberal backbench MPP for Sault Ste. Marie. The bill was re-introduced in October that year by Attorney General Chris Bentley, stating that "we see fewer and fewer acknowledgments, demonstrations of regret, demonstrations of remorse, until the lawsuit."

The passage of the bill was supported by the Progressive Conservative Party of Ontario, despite some original opposition from critic Christine Elliott, but opposed by the Ontario NDP.

Public perception 
The law has attracted a level of popular commentary, often focused on the stereotype of Canadian usage of the word "sorry." However, several other Canadian provinces, such as British Columbia, Saskatchewan, and Manitoba, as well as several American states have similar laws in place.

The law received support from the Ontario Hospital Association, the Registered Nurses Association of Ontario, and the Ontario Medical Association, as well as the Ontario Bar Association.

References

External links 
 Text of the Act in English

Ontario provincial legislation
2009 in Canadian law
2009 in Ontario